The Budenicenses were a small Gallic tribe dwelling in the present-day Gard department, near Nemausos (modern Nîmes), during the Roman period.

Name 
They are attested as Budenicenses on an inscription found in Collias (Gard). A dedication to the god Mars Budenicus was also discovered in the same town. The latter is probably a Celtic rendering of Mars Militaris.

The ethnonym Budenicenses derives from the Celtic term *budīnā, meaning 'troop, host', probably 'troop guarding the frontier' (cf. Old Irish buiden, Middle Welsh byddin 'troop, army'; Late Latin bodǐna 'boundary marker' > French borne, a loanword from Gaulish).

The town of Bezouce (Gard), attested as Biducia in 1146 CE, is named after the Gallic tribe.

References

Bibliography 

 
 

Gauls
Tribes of pre-Roman Gaul
Historical Celtic peoples